Best of Ballade: Empathy is the fifth compilation album by Japanese singer Shizuka Kudo. It was released on November 20, 1992, through Pony Canyon. It is Kudo's first ballad collection, followed by Best of Ballade: Current in 1998. Half of the album is made up of ballads from previously released studio albums while the other half features new songs recorded for the album as well as unreleased ballads co-written by Kudo, under the pseudonym Aeri.

Commercial performance
Best of Ballade: Empathy debuted at number six on the Oricon Albums Chart, with 92,000 units sold. It dropped three positions to number nine on its second week, selling 37,000 copies. The album charted in the top 100 for eight consecutive weeks, selling a reported total of 180,000 copies during its chart run.

Track listing

Charts

Certification

Release history

References

1992 compilation albums
Shizuka Kudo albums
Pony Canyon compilation albums